Morris (or Maurice) Graham Netting (1904–1996) was a herpetologist, an early participant in the conservation and environmental movement, and a director (1954–1975) of the Carnegie Museum in Pittsburgh.

Biography
Netting was born in Wilkinsburg, Pennsylvania. He had a long career at the Carnegie Museum of Natural History in Pittsburgh, Pennsylvania, where he was Curator of the Section of Amphibians and Reptiles from 1931 to 1954. (He was succeeded by Curator Neil D. Richmond.) In 1935, Netting and Leonard Llewellyn discovered the Cheat Mountain salamander (Plethodon nettingi) , a species unique and endemic to West Virginia. He was Secretary (1931–1947) and President (1948–1950) of the American Society of Ichthyologists and Herpetologists.

In the mid 1950s, Netting helped create the Museum's field station, Powdermill Nature Reserve. He also helped found many environmental organizations in Pennsylvania including the Western Pennsylvania Conservancy. Netting served as Director of the Carnegie Museum from 1954 to 1975.

References

External links 
 Carnegie Museum of Natural History Archives (Microsoft Word document).

American herpetologists
1996 deaths
1904 births
20th-century American zoologists
People from Wilkinsburg, Pennsylvania